The YF-40 is a Chinese liquid rocket engine burning N2O4 and UDMH in a gas generator cycle. It has dual gimbaling combustion chambers.

Originally it was developed for the Long March 1D second stage. It is used on the third stage of the Long March 4 family of launch vehicles.

References

Rocket engines of China
Rocket engines using hypergolic propellant
Rocket engines using the gas-generator cycle